Copelatus mahajanga is a species of diving beetle. It is part of the genus Copelatus, which is in the subfamily Copelatinae of the family Dytiscidae. It was described by Pederzani & Hájek in 2005.

References

mahajanga
Beetles described in 2005